The University of Computer Studies, Pyay, is a university in Pyay, Bago Region, Myanmar, offering courses in computer science and information technology.

Background History
University of Computer Studies, Pyay is a government funded university located in Pyay, Bago Region with an emphasis is on computer engineering at the undergraduate and graduate levels. Founded in 2004 as a Government Computer College (GCC) and during the first year of GCC only computer application trainings were offered. Starting from 2005, undergraduate student admissions have begun. In 2007, Government Computer College (Pyay) became a university named Computer University (Pyay). Its name was changed to University  of Computer Studies (Pyay) in the year 2017. The campus has an area of 17.68 acres and lies to the south of 081/2 milestone on the highway from Pyay to Aunglan.

Degrees Offered
Bachelor of Computer Science (B.C.Sc.)
Bachelor of Computer Technology (B.C.Tech.)

Departments 
 Faculty of Computer Systems and Technologies
 Faculty of Computer Science
 Faculty of Information Science
 Faculty of Computing
 Myanmar Department
 English Department
 Physics Department
 Application Department
 Library Department
 Maintenance Department
 Administrative Department
 Finance Department
 Student Affair

Courses
First Year Computer Science & Technology
Second Year Computer Science
Second Year Computer Technology
Third Year Computer Science
Third Year Computer Technology
Fourth Year Computer Science
Fourth Year Computer Technology 
Fifth Year Computer Science
Fifth Year Computer Technology

References

Technological universities in Myanmar
Universities and colleges in Bago Region